Patrick O'Neal Taylor Jr. (born April 29, 1998) is an American football running back for the Green Bay Packers of the National Football League (NFL). He played college football at Memphis.

College career
As a true freshman, Taylor was the Tigers' second-leading rusher with 546 yards on 93 carries and two touchdowns. He was Memphis' second-leading rusher again as a sophomore after rushing 157 times for 866 yards and a team-high 13 touchdowns while also catching 19 passes for 148 yards and one touchdown. Taylor rushed for 1,122 yards and 16 touchdowns as a junior. Taylor missed half of his senior season due to a foot injury and finished the year with 350 rushing yards and five touchdowns.

Professional career

Taylor signed with the Green Bay Packers as an undrafted free agent on April 29, 2020, shortly after the conclusion of the 2020 NFL Draft. He was placed on the active/non-football injury list at the start of training camp on July 31, 2020. He was moved to the reserve/non-football injury list at the start of the regular season on September 5, 2020. He began practicing with the team on December 17, but the team did not activate him at the end of his 21-day practice window. On August 31, 2021, Packers released Taylor as part of their final roster cuts. He was signed to the practice squad the next day. On November 4, 2021, Taylor was promoted to the active roster. He got his first career touchdown in a game against the Detroit Lions in week 18.

Taylor was waived on August 30, 2022, and signed to the practice squad the next day. Taylor was elevated from the practice squad to the active roster on September 17, 2022. Taylor was promoted from the practice squad to the active roster on September 24, 2022. On November 1, 2022, he was released by the Packers and re-signed to the practice squad two days later. On November 15, 2022, he was promoted back to the active roster. He was released eight days later. On November 25, 2022, Taylor was signed to the practice squad and elevated to the active roster a day later. A week later, he was once again elevated for gameday. He was signed back to the active roster on December 19.

NFL career statistics

Regular season

Postseason

References

External links
Green Bay Packers bio
Memphis Tigers bio

Living people
1998 births
American football running backs
Memphis Tigers football players
Players of American football from Texas
Sportspeople from Harris County, Texas
Green Bay Packers players
People from Humble, Texas